Shangri-La at the Fort is a five-star luxury hotel and mixed-used building in Bonifacio Global City, Taguig, Metro Manila, Philippines.  It opened on March 1, 2016, and is one of the three hotels managed by Shangri-La Hotels and Resorts located in metro Manila. It also hosts residential units.

Architecture and design
US-based Handel Architects is the design architect of the Shangri-La at the Fort, while GF and Partners Architects Co. is the architect of record. Manny Samson and Associates were the interior designers of the building.

Construction
The groundbreaking for the building took place on July 3, 2008, in a ceremony led by then-Philippine President Gloria Macapagal Arroyo, though construction began in 2011. The hotel had a soft opening on March 1, 2016.

Facilities

Hotel
The Shangri-La Hotel at the Fort hosts 576 rooms and suites as of August 2017, with each room at least  big.

Residential
The building has two designated residential areas, namely Horizon Homes and Shangri-La Residences. The 98 units in Horizon Homes, which are privately owned, occupy the upper levels of the tower.

Other
For events, the building has two event halls; the pillar-less  Grand Ball Room can accommodate 1,800 people and the  Bonifacio Hall can hold 715 people. Nineteen multifunction rooms are also spread across the building's several floors. The Adventure Zone is a multilevel children's playground.

The building also hosts seven main dining outlets, namely: High Street Café, High Street Lounge, Canton Road, Raging Bull Chophouse and Bar, Samba Poolside, and Limitless. , concentrated mostly on the building's ground floor is dedicated to retail.

References

Skyscrapers in Bonifacio Global City
Residential skyscrapers in Metro Manila
Hotels in Metro Manila
Shangri-La Hotels and Resorts
Residential buildings completed in 2016
Hotel buildings completed in 2016
Skyscraper hotels in the Philippines
21st-century architecture in the Philippines